Listed below is a table of historical exchange rates relative to the U.S. dollar, at present the most widely traded currency in the world. An exchange rate represents the value of one currency in another. An exchange rate between two currencies fluctuates over time. The value of a currency relative to a third currency may be obtained by dividing one U.S. dollar rate by another. For example, if there are ¥120 to the dollar and €1.2 to the dollar then the number of yen per euro is 120/1.2 = 100.

The magnitude of the numbers in the list does not indicate, by themselves, the strength or weakness of a particular currency. For example, the U.S. dollar could be rebased tomorrow so that 1 new dollar was worth 100 old dollars. Then all the numbers in the table would be multiplied by one hundred, but it does not mean all the world's currencies just got weaker. However, it is useful to look at the variation over time of a particular exchange rate. If the number consistently increases through time, then it is a strong indication that the economy of the country or countries using that currency are in a less robust state than that of the United States (see e.g., the Turkish lira). The exchange rates of advanced economies, such as those of Japan or Hong Kong, against the dollar tend to fluctuate up and down, representing much shorter-term relative economic strengths, rather than move consistently in a particular direction.

The data are taken at varying times of the year or maybe the average for the whole year. Some of the data for the years 1997-2002 refers to the rate on, or close to, January 1 of that year. Some of the data for 2003 refers to rates on May 28 for countries beginning with A-E, and June 2 for countries listed F-Z. Exchange rates can vary considerably even within a year and so current rates may differ markedly from those shown here. Caveat lector.

Table for 1850 to 2000

Table for recent years

2020 Exchange rate 
USD exchange rate in May 2020 according to XE:

See also 

Bretton Woods system for more exchange rates 1945 to 1971
Gold standard for exchange rates around 1900 for currencies using the gold standard
Fixed exchange rates to the euro
Currency pair
ISO 4217 currency codes
Historical exchange rates of Argentine currency

Notes

References

Sources 

 http://investintaiwan.nat.gov.tw/en/env/stats/exchange_rates.html
 The 2003 data was taken from Pacific Exchange Rate Service
 The graph back to 1969 was generated using data from the Reserve Bank of Australia

External links
 Historical Exchange Rates (Chart and Table, 1971-present)
 Foreign Currency Units per 1 U.S. Dollar, 1948 - 2007

Foreign exchange market
Currencies of the United States
Exchange rates, historical
Dollar